HMS Reindeer was a Royal Navy Mariner-class composite screw gunvessel of 8 guns.

Construction

Designed by Nathaniel Barnaby, the Royal Navy Director of Naval Construction, her hull was of composite construction; that is, iron keel, frames, stem and stern posts with wooden planking. She was fitted with a 2-cylinder horizontal compound expansion steam engine driving a single screw, produced by Hawthorn Leslie. She was rigged with three masts, with square rig on the fore- and main-masts, making her a barque-rigged vessel.  Her keel was laid at Devonport Royal Dockyard on 15 January 1883 and she was launched on 14 November 1883.  Her entire class were re-classified in November 1884 as sloops before they entered service.

Career

She was converted to a boom defence vessel in 1904. During World War I, she collided with the Royal Navy stores carrier  in the Mediterranean Sea on 6 June 1915, sinking Immingham. She was lent to the Liverpool Salvage Association as a salvage vessel in 1917.  Re-engined in 1918 by Fairfield Shipbuilding and Engineering Company with a  engine, she was renamed Reindeer I and sold to the Halifax Shipyard Ltd as a salvage ship on 12 July 1924. She was abandoned at sea on 12 March 1932. Her 30 crew were rescued by the ocean liner .

References
 

 

Mariner-class gunvessels
Ships built in Plymouth, Devon
1883 ships
Victorian-era gunboats of the United Kingdom
World War I sloops of the United Kingdom
Auxiliary gateship classes
Maritime incidents in 1915
Maritime incidents in 1932